Semnan's codes are 86 and 96. In public cars, Taxis and Governal cars the letter is always the same. But in simple cars this letter (ب) depends on the city.

86
86 is Semnan County and Mehdishahr County's code and all of the letters are for Semnan.

96

Road transport in Iran
Transportation in Semnan Province
Semnan Province